The following lists events that happened during 1894 in Chile.

Incumbents
President of Chile: Jorge Montt

Events

May
6 May - The commune of Renca is founded.

Births
9 September - Carlos F. Borcosque (died 1965)
17 October - Pablo de Rokha (died 1968)

Deaths
date unknown - Rafael de la Barra López (born 1810)

References 

 
Years of the 19th century in Chile
Chile